János Németh (June 12, 1906 in Budapest – March 5, 1988 in Madrid, Spain) was a Hungarian water polo player who competed in the 1932 Summer Olympics and in the 1936 Summer Olympics.

In 1932 he was part of the Hungarian team which won the gold medal. He played all three matches. Four years later he won again the gold medal with the Hungarian team. At the Berlin Games he played all seven matches.

On club level he played for Újpesti TE.

See also
 Hungary men's Olympic water polo team records and statistics
 List of Olympic champions in men's water polo
 List of Olympic medalists in water polo (men)
 List of men's Olympic water polo tournament top goalscorers
 List of members of the International Swimming Hall of Fame

External links
 

1906 births
1988 deaths
Hungarian male water polo players
Water polo players at the 1932 Summer Olympics
Water polo players at the 1936 Summer Olympics
Olympic gold medalists for Hungary in water polo
Water polo players from Budapest
Medalists at the 1936 Summer Olympics
Medalists at the 1932 Summer Olympics
20th-century Hungarian people